Autostrade per l'Italia S.p.A. is an Italian joint-stock company, originally born as a publicly owned company under the control of IRI, but privatized in 1999 and then incorporated in its current form in 2003. It has as its activity the management of motorway sections under concession, as well as the carrying out of related maintenance.

Until 2021, the company is part of the Atlantia group, which owns 88.06% of the share capital and which refers, as the main shareholder, to the Benetton family.

After the collapse of the Ponte Morandi of Genoa in August 2018 and the death of 43 people, the Italian government tried to enter in the property and management of the national highway network. In September 2020, a preliminary agreement was reached with Atlantia.

Until the spring 2021, it will be constituted a new company to which Atlantia will transfer the 70% of his actions taken on the equity of Aspi. The public bank Cassa Depositi e Prestiti will pay an initial capital increase of four billions euros to cover Aspi's long-term debts and other 2 billions to buy the residual quote of 18% held by Atlantia in Aspi.

As of September 2020, Atlantia owns the 88% of the equity of Aspi, while Edizione, the holding of the Benetton family, owns the 30% of Atlantia. Autostrade per l'Italia as a whole is valued at 11 billion euros. In the following years, the Italian public property will have to finance extraordinary maintenance costs extimated of around 13 billion euros.

References

Engineering companies of Italy